Armadillo (Antonio Rodriguez) is a supervillain appearing in American comic books published by Marvel Comics.

Publication history
Created by Mark Gruenwald, Paul Neary, and Dennis Janke, the character made his first appearance in Captain America #308 (August 1985).

Gruenwald recounted that Armadillo "is just a silly monster I wanted to throw in as kind of a joke on the old Marvel armadillo thing in the letters page".

Fictional character biography
Antonio Rodriguez was born in San Antonio, Texas. He was given superhuman strength and durability by Dr. Karl Malus. This process involved having his human genes combined with the genetic material of an armadillo which gave him the appearance of a humanoid armadillo. The Armadillo's original motivation during his criminal career was to get enough money to be able to pay a doctor to discover a way to cure his girlfriend Maria of an unspecified terminal illness. When she was cured from her treatment, Maria abandoned him because of his appearance. Since that time, his motive has been to secure enough money to pay the Power Broker or some other scientist to reverse the process which transformed him. As part of the Armadillo's first encounter with superheroes, he was dispatched by Dr. Karl Malus to break into the West Coast Avengers Compound and free Goliath. There, the Armadillo battled Captain America who released him after learning of the sacrifice he made for the comatose Maria.

The Armadillo later joined the Unlimited Class Wrestling Federation. While on tour with the UCWF, he battled Captain America and Hawkeye atop the Empire State Building. He had apparently gone berserk after discovering his estranged wife Bonita with another man, and was intending to commit suicide. Captain America tried to talk him down, but the Armadillo jumped off the building. He survived the fall, but was arrested.

He was later seen incarcerated in the Vault. Having been talked out of a criminal career by Captain America and his allies, he surrendered to Vagabond to avoid further prosecution. Armadillo only wished to serve out the remainder of his sentence. To this end, he fought against various supervillains who wished to engineer large-scale breakouts, including Venom, and later various supervillains released by the Thunderbolts as they broke out Moonstone.

After being released from the Vault, Armadillo became the regional champion of the Ultimate Fighting League. After his defeat by Daniel Axum (formerly the villain Battler), Armadillo was reduced to begging in an alleyway. There, he talked Daniel Axum out of joining a Spider-Man Revenge Squad.

Having fallen on hard times, Armadillo proceeded to join the Constrictor and Jack O'Lantern in robbing an armored car. After his defeat by Hercules, Armadillo was incarcerated at The Raft, and chained to Tiger Shark. During the break-out initiated by Electro, Armadillo and Tiger Shark escaped and hid out in the town of Fairbury, Illinois. There, they were confronted by the New Warriors, resulting in a battle in which both fugitives were defeated. Afterwards, Armadillo joined Vil-Anon, a twelve-step group dedicated to helping individuals overcome their criminal tendencies.

During the Civil War storyline, the Hood hires Armadillo as part of his criminal organization to take advantage of the split in the superhero community caused by the Superhuman Registration Act, and he is later seen among his gang. Armadillo is then spotted at the funeral of Stilt-Man which was located at the Bar with No Name. After poisoning the guests, the Punisher blew up the bar. It was later mentioned that "they all had to get their stomachs pumped and be treated for third-degree burns."

Around this time, he was seen entering the office of The Consultant, a criminal PR agent of sorts who improves the reputation and occasionally powers of super-villains. Upon Armadillo's entering his office, the Consultant asked his secretary to cancel the rest of his appointments for the afternoon as he anticipated a lot of work improving Armadillo's image.

The Armadillo later took place in the Fifty State Initiative, as a member of Texas's superhero team, The Rangers. He assists in saving the President from an assassination attempt by HYDRA forces. Many other heroes are involved in this as well.

However, he was fired by the Rangers for unstated reasons. He was next seen doing lucha libre wrestling in Mexico for small cash, eventually being recruited by MODOK. After being one of the few villains that does not betray MODOK, Armadillo gains more money than initially promised. He happily departs with Puma and Nightshade (with whom he'd developed a friendship, and shows a desire for them to remain as a team).

Armadillo is mentioned as being incarcerated in The Raft next to Doctor Doom prior to the breakout in Secret Invasion. A group of former HYDRA agents kidnapped Armadillo to evaluate a neurotoxin Anathema on him. They made a presentation to Madame Hydra, to get back in Hydra. Armadillo is saved by the True Believers.

After the Siege of Asgard, he was seen as a bodyguard for the new Rose. Armadillo comes into conflict with Jackpot and Spider-Man when they try to infiltrate the Rose's penthouse. Armadillo throws Jackpot through a window and prevents Spider-Man from saving her.

Armadillo later hides out in Puebla, but one of the locals reports him to a vigilante group, who attack him. The fight is quickly joined by the Hulk and She-Hulk. She-Hulk convinces Armadillo to stop fighting. She also suggests helping the people of Puebla before turning himself in promising to act as his lawyer in court.

He is next seen fighting the Scarlet Spider at a rodeo in Houston when he drunkenly tries to reconnect with his ex-girlfriend.

Following the Avengers vs. X-Men storyline, Armadillo is seen taking part in a prison riot. Mimic and Rogue were the only ones to respond. Copying the powers of Armadillo, Equinox, and Man-Bull, Mimic and Rogue were able to stop the riot. Boomerang and Owl then hire Armadillo onto the Sinister Sixteen, assembled to distract the Chameleon's forces while Boomerang steals from him.

Armadillo, working for She-Thing, is next seen attacking the Thing while they are both imprisoned.

Armadillo later joins HYDRA after Baron Helmut Zemo promises to cure his condition in exchange for his allegiance. He takes part in HYDRA's plot to sterilize the human race by using Inhuman blood, but betrays Zemo after Sam Wilson, the new Captain America, tells Armadillo that by serving HYDRA, he'd be trading his soul and humanity just to be cured.

Armadillo is later revealed to have been hired by Dr. Karl Malus in exchange for a cure to his condition. He aids the Sons of the Serpent in a trafficking plot to ship illegal immigrants for a genetic experiment conducted by Karl Malus and fights Sam Wilson, who had followed the leader of the smugglers to a diner. During the fight, Armadillo expresses his anger and frustration on Sam for not keeping his promise to cure him.

Armadillo is later seen on a crime spree when he is defeated by Ironheart.

During the "Opening Salvo" part of the 2017 "Secret Empire" storyline, Armadillo is recruited by Baron Helmut Zemo to join the Army of Evil.

During the "Search for Tony Stark" arc, Armadillo rejoined Hood's gang and assisted in the attack on Castle Doom.

During the "Hunted" storyline, Armadillo is among the animal-themed characters that were captured by Taskmaster and Black Ant for Kraven the Hunter's "Great Hunt" that is sponsored by Arcade's company Arcade Industries. He was seen watching the fight between Spider-Man and Scorpion until the Hunter-Bots created by Arcade Industries arrived. Then he was seen fleeing from the Hunter-Bots when the "Great Hunt" begins. Armadillo was seen with the remaining animal-themed characters who were gathered by Vulture. Armadillo partook in the attack on the Hunter-Bots. Armadillo was freed when Kraven the Hunter had Arcade lower the forcefield around Central Park. Armadillo and the Serpent Society were seen charging towards the police only to be subdued by the Avengers and the Fantastic Four.

Powers and abilities
Due to a genetic altering procedure performed on him by the villainous Dr. Karl Malus, Armadillo has superhuman strength, stamina, and durability. It was originally believed that his costume, a scaly nine-foot-tall orange armored hide with claws useful for digging through earth, was bonded to his skin by this process. It was later revealed that it was not a costume, but part of his body that had been mutagenically altered with the genetic material of an actual armadillo. His armor is bulletproof and his claws can tear through all but the densest of substances.

The Armadillo is an excellent hand-to-hand combatant as he was a skilled street fighter prior to his superhuman transformation.

Love interests
Maria Bonita Rodriguez was Antonio Rodriguez's wife. While Antonio was serving prison time, his wife fell to an unspecified illness. After his release, he tried to find a cure. He met Dr Karl Malus who turned Antonio into the Armadillo and promised to cure Bonita if Antonio obeyed his orders. After Armadillo's encounter with Captain America, the Avengers forced Karl Malus to cure Antonio Rodriguez's wife. When he discovered that during his wrestling career his wife cheated on him with a man named Ramon, Armadillo went berserk. At one point, he escaped the Vault to find and kill his unfaithful wife. Finally, he was talked out of it by Vagabond.

Daisy Schilling became Antonio Rodriguez's girlfriend. His dismissal from the Rangers impacted him and she left him because he was distant. Later, Daisy Schilling became a model in Texas and engaged to Wyatt Taft. When he learned of this, a drunk Armadillo charged in a Houston rodeo calling for her. Scarlet Spider intervened and the two fought. Armadillo's ex-girlfriend jumped into the field and stopped them. She'd always had feelings for Antonio Rodriguez. The two lovers hugged and kissed under the applause of the crowd.

Reception
 In 2020, CBR.com ranked Armadillo 1st in their "Spider-Man: 10 Weirdest Animal Villains From The Comics That We'd Like To See In The MCU" list.

In other media
Armadillo appears as a figure in the HeroClix game.
 Armadillo appears in M.O.D.O.K., voiced by Dustin Ybarra. Unlike his comic book counterpart, this version's story is depicted as pathetic, as he still longs for his wife Irene even though they have been apart for eight years and he never formally proposed to her. In the episode "If Saturday Be... For the Boys!", Armadillo and several other D-List villains are recruited by MODOK for his plan to steal Captain America's shield. During this time, Armadillo takes a detour to Irene's house to try and win her back, but ends up in a fight with her new boyfriend Mandrill until MODOK breaks it up and teaches Armadillo to move on with his life. Armadillo also makes minor appearances in the episodes "If Bureaucracy Be... Thy Death!", "What Menace Doth the Mailman Deliver!", and "Days of Future M.O.D.O.K.s".

References

External links
 
 
 
 Armadillo at writeups.org

Characters created by Mark Gruenwald
Characters created by Paul Neary
Comics characters introduced in 1985
Fictional characters from San Antonio, Texas
Fictional characters from Texas
Fictional characters with superhuman durability or invulnerability
Fictional professional wrestlers
Marvel Comics characters with superhuman strength
Marvel Comics hybrids
Marvel Comics male supervillains
Marvel Comics martial artists
Marvel Comics mutates